This Timeline of artificial satellites and Space probes includes uncrewed Spacecraft including technology demonstrators, observatories, lunar probes, and interplanetary probes. First satellites from each country are included. Not included are most Earth science satellites, commercial satellites or crewed missions.

Timeline

1950s

1960s

1970s

1980s

1990s

2000s

2010s

2020s

References

External links

Current and Upcoming Launches
Missions-NASA
Unmanned spaceflight discussion forum
Chronology of Lunar and Planetary Exploration (homepage)

Artificial satellites and space probes